The Bloody Hands of the Law is a 1973 Italian crime film directed by Mario Gariazzo and starring Klaus Kinski.

Cast
 Philippe Leroy – Commissario Gianni De Carmine
 Tony Norton – D'Amico
 Silvia Monti – Linda De Carmine
 Klaus Kinski – Vito Quattroni
 Fausto Tozzi – Nicolò Patrovita
 Pia Giancaro – Lilly Antonelli
 Cyril Cusack – The Judge
 Guido Alberti – Prof. Palmieri
 Lincoln Tate – Joe Gambino
 Marino Masé – Giuseppe di Leo
 Luciano Rossi
 Sergio Fantoni – Musante
 Rosario Borelli – Salvatore Perrone
 Tom Felleghy
 Valentino Macchi
 Lorenzo Fineschi
 Denise O'Hara – Elsa Lutzer
 Lorenzo Magnolia
 Stelio Candelli

References

External links

1973 films
Italian crime films
1970s Italian-language films
1973 crime films
Films directed by Mario Gariazzo
Films scored by Stelvio Cipriani
Poliziotteschi films
1970s Italian films